Helena Regional Airport  is a public airport two miles northeast of Helena, in Lewis and Clark County, Montana, United States. It is owned by the Helena Regional Airport Authority.

The National Plan of Integrated Airport Systems for 2011–2015 categorized it as a primary commercial service airport (more than 10,000 enplanements per year). Federal Aviation Administration records say the airport had 85,649 passenger boardings (enplanements) in calendar year 2008, 88,314 in 2009 and 98,193 in 2010.

Facilities
Helena Regional Airport covers 1,224 acres (495 ha) at an elevation of 3,877 feet (1,182 m). It has three asphalt runways: 9/27 is 9,000 by 150 feet (2,743 x 46 m); 5/23 is 4,644 by 75 feet (1,415 x 23 m); 16/34 is 2,989 by 75 feet (911 x 23 m).

In 2013 the airport had 38,877 aircraft operations, average 106 per day: 68% general aviation, 14% military, 14% air taxi, and 4% airline. 137 aircraft were then based at the airport: 74% single-engine, 14% multi-engine, 2% jet, 3% helicopter, 2% ultralight, and 5% military.

Airlines and destinations

Top destinations

See also
 Montana World War II Army Airfields
 List of airports in Montana

References

External links
 Helena Regional Airport, official site
 
 
 

Airports in Montana
Airfields of the United States Army Air Forces in Montana
Buildings and structures in Lewis and Clark County, Montana
Buildings and structures in Helena, Montana
Transportation in Lewis and Clark County, Montana